Uptime / Downtime is a 2010 mashup double album by The Kleptones.

Track listing

Uptime
Call To Mind - 2:30
Samples - Jim Steinman - Love, Death, and an American Guitar
Voodoo Sabotage - 4:32
Sound Bites - Cheap Trick - I want you to want me (announcement of next song Surrender at the end of live version)
Samples - Beastie Boys - Sabotage
Samples - The Prodigy -  Voodoo People (Pendulum Remix)
Welcome Back - 5:04
Samples - Boney M. - Rivers of Babylon
Samples - Emerson, Lake & Palmer - Karn Evil 9
Samples - Guns N' Roses - Welcome to the Jungle
Samples - The Chemical Brothers - Hey Boy Hey Girl which samples - Rock Master Scott & the Dynamic Three - The Roof Is on Fire
Samples - Basement Jaxx - Where's Your Head At?
Samples - Missy Elliott - Lose Control (which samples Cybotron - Clear)
Samples - LFO - LFO
Samples - Meat Beat Manifesto - Radio Babylon (which samples Boney M - Rivers of Babylon)
Samples - Joey Beltram - Energy Flash
Samples - The Future Sound of London - We Have Explosive
Hella Touch - 4:32
Samples - No Doubt - Hella Good
Samples - Busta Rhymes - Don't Touch Me (Throw Da Water On 'Em) 
Samples - The Flying Pickets - Only You (Yazoo cover)
Samples - Diana Ross - Upside Down
Can't Be Paranoid - 2:33
Samples - Genesis - I Can't Dance
Samples - Garbage - I Think I'm Paranoid
Samples - B-Line - Herbal Hand (which samples Herbie Hancock - Hang Up Your Hang Ups)
Samples - Diana Ross - Upside Down
Care - 3:43
Samples - Faith No More - We Care a Lot
Sound bites - Batman, The Joker:  "Gentlemen, let's broaden our minds"
Deeper Sand - 3:14
Samples - Aretha Franklin - A Deeper Love
Samples - Metallica - Enter Sandman
Samples - Electric Light Orchestra - Fire on High
Sound bites -The 'Burbs
Sound bites - Michael Mills - Radio Show: Hidden and Satanic Messages in Rock Music
MKY Da HVN - 4:54
Samples - Nas - Hip Hop Is Dead
Samples - Iron Butterfly - In-A-Gadda-Da-Vida
Samples - Cream - Sunshine of Your Love
Samples - Munk - Live fast, die old
Samples - The Pixies - Monkey Gone to Heaven
Samples - Rage Against the Machine - Killing in the Name
Come Again - 8:12
Samples - The Beatles - Come Together
Samples - Dezo - Y'all Know What It Iz
Samples - Lil Wayne - Best Rapper Alive
Samples - Beastie Boys - No Sleep till Brooklyn
Samples - Breakwater - Release The Beast
Samples - Rare Earth - I Just Want to Celebrate
Samples - Queen & David Bowie - Under Pressure
Samples - Cypress Hill - Insane in the Brain
Samples - John Lennon - Power to the People
Samples - Boston - More Than a Feeling
Samples - Freeez - I.O.U.
Samples - Criminal Element Orchestra - Put The Needle to the Record
Samples - Art of Noise - Close (to the Edit)
Samples - S'Express - Theme from S'Express
Destiny And Tenacity - 6:45
Samples - Genesis - Turn It on Again
Samples - Simple Minds - New Gold Dream (81-82-83-84)
Samples - Art of Noise - Close (to the Edit)
Samples - U.S.U.R.A. - Open Your Mind
Samples - Richie Havens - Going Back to My Roots
Samples - A. R. Rahman & M.I.A. - O…Saya
Samples - Dizzee Rascal & Armand Van Helden - Bonkers
Samples - Kicksquad - Soundclash (Champion Sound)
Samples - The Hives - Tick Tick Boom
Cubikini - 3:20
Samples - S'Express - Theme from S'Express
Samples - Bikini Kill - Rebel Girl
Samples - Bizarre Inc - Playing with Knives
Samples - 808 State - Cubik
Samples - Chemical Brothers - Song to the Siren
Brightness And Contrast - 5:47
Samples - Pixies - La La Love You
Samples - MC Hammer - U Can't Touch This
Samples - New Order - Blue Monday
Samples - Nirvana - On a Plain
Samples - Bruce Springsteen - 57 Channels (And Nothin' On)
Samples - The Cure - The Hanging Garden
The Highest Kite - 4:03
Samples - Weezer - Troublemaker
Samples - Hot Chip - Ready for the Floor
Samples - Saxon - Dallas 1PM
Samples - Motörhead - We Are the Road Crew
Samples - The Prodigy - Charly
Samples - Purple Ribbon All-Stars - Kryptonite (I'm on It)
Samples - Nine Inch Nails - Discipline
Samples - Rusko - Cockney Thug (Caspa Remix)
Body Jump - 3:17
Samples - Caper ft Sweetie Irie - Jump Up
Samples - DJ C & Zulu - Body Work
Nothing Beats A Large - 3:12
Samples - Aphrodite - King of the Beats (which samples Pumpkin and The Profile All-Stars "Here Comes That Beat")
Samples - Ultramagnetic MCs - Poppa Large
Samples - Average White Band - Pick Up the Pieces
Samples - Madonna - Frozen
Samples - Gat Decor - Passion
Mad Groove - 5:44
Samples - Gat Decor - Passion
Samples - Sub Focus - Rock It
Samples - Yellow Magic Orchestra - Behind the Mask (Orbital Remix)
Sound bites - Peter Finch - Mad As Hell (speech from Network)
Samples - Kraftwerk - Tour de France
Samples - Double 99 - RIP Groove
Samples - Shut Up And Dance - Green Man (or 'The Rain' by Ryuichi Sakamoto which it samples)
This Song Smells - 4:19
Sound bites - Donald Sutherland - Wedding sermon from Little Murders
Sound bites - Roger Hill - Cyrus' speech from The Warriors
Samples - Nirvana - Smells Like Teen Spirit
Samples - Blur - Song 2
Final Word - 0:55
Sound bites - Bill Drummond - Foreword to German audiobook version of The Manual
Samples - Prefab Sprout - When Love Breaks Down

Downtime
Interlude - 4:37
Sound bites - Graham Crowden - Professor Millar introducing the Genesis Project (from Britannia Hospital)
Samples - Karlheinz Stockhausen - Stimmung
Samples - Le Système Crapoutchik - Aussi Loin Que Je Me Souvienne
Freeze - 2:53
Samples - Scott Walker - 30 Century Man
Samples - Philip Glass - Knee 1 (from Einstein on the Beach)
Sound bites - Bob Dylan - "I don't believe you" (from The Bootleg Series Vol. 4: Bob Dylan Live 1966, The "Royal Albert Hall" Concert)
Sound bites - Ginger Lynn (from Metallica - "Turn The Page" music video)
Seed Of Idumea - 3:54
Samples - Current 93 - Idumæa (Vocals: Antony Hegarty)
Samples - The Seeds - Faded Picture
Stay - 4:49
Samples - Yeah Yeah Yeahs - Maps
Sound bites - Al Pacino and Paul Sorvino - Dialogue from Cruising
Untired - 6:03
Samples - Foo Fighters - Tired of You
Hammer - 5:59
Samples - Sensational Alex Harvey Band - Hammer Song
Samples - David Sylvian - The Healing Place
Samples - Brand X - Isis Mourning (Part II)
Black Medicine - 8:32
Sound bites - Dialogue from The Decline of Western Civilization
Samples - John Mayall - Medicine Man
Samples - Nick Drake - Black Eyed Dog
Samples - Peter Gabriel - Lead a Normal Life
Sound bites - Dark Star - Computer, various warning messages
Unbroken - 2:14
Sound bites - John Lennon - 1971 Rolling Stone interview 
Correspondence - 9:17
Samples - David Bowie - Warszawa
Samples - Neil Young - Words (Between the Lines of Age)
Samples - Pearl Jam - Alive
Samples - Rush - Closer to the Heart
Samples - The Planets - Lines
Samples - Ian Dury - Deus Ex Machina (video game)
Sound bites - Harry Dean Stanton - Dialogue from the 1996 spoken word adaptation of Fear and Loathing in Las Vegas
Incandescence - 3:14
Samples - ZZ Top - Hot, Blue, & Righteous
Exit - 3:02
Samples - John Mayall - Fly Tomorrow
Samples - Beck - Farewell Ride
Samples - Aesop Rock & Del tha Funkee Homosapien - Preservation (which samples Mike Brant - Mais Dans La Lumière)
Entrance - 6:52
Sound bites - Michael Moorcock & The Deep Fix - Narration 3 from New Worlds Fair
Samples - Nick Cave and the Bad Seeds - Messiah Ward
Samples - Dorothy Ashby - For Some We Loved
Samples - Black Rebel Motorcycle Club - As Sure as the Sun
Samples - Dinosaur Jr. - Feel the Pain
Samples - Neil Young - After the Gold Rush
Samples - Adam and the Ants - Prince Charming
Sound bites - Michael Moorcock & The Deep Fix - Narration 4 from New Worlds Fair
Sound bites - Dialogue from The Decline of Western Civilization
Killing Jah - 6:35
Sound bites - Dialogue from The Decline of Western Civilization
Samples - Siouxsie and the Banshees - The Killing Jar
Samples - Thompson Twins - Kamikaze/Frozen in Time
Resignation - 7:40
Samples - Marianne Faithfull - I Ain't Goin' Down to the Well No More
Samples - Poco - Magnolia
Sound bites - Paul Newman - Dialogue from Cool Hand Luke

References

External links
 The Kleptones Official Site
 Official Uptime / Downtime album page

The Kleptones albums
2010 remix albums